The Jordan River is a  headwater tributary of the Rappahannock River in northern Virginia in the United States. It rises in Shenandoah National Park and flows for its entire length in northern Rappahannock County. The river generally flows eastward and joins the Rappahannock River from the west. It is part of the watershed of Chesapeake Bay, via the Rappahannock.

See also
List of Virginia rivers

References

Rivers of Virginia
Tributaries of the Rappahannock River
Rivers of Rappahannock County, Virginia